Thomas George Corrigan (1928–2011)  was an Irish Anglican priest.
He was educated at Trinity College, Dublin and the Church of Ireland Theological College; and ordained in 1959. After a curacy at Cavan he  held incumbencies in Drung, Belfast and Enniskeen. He died on 5 September 2011.

Notes

2011 deaths
20th-century Irish Anglican priests
Alumni of Trinity College Dublin
1928 births
Archdeacons of Meath
Alumni of the Church of Ireland Theological Institute